Channoidei is a suborder of fish in the order Anabantiformes. It contains two families: the true snakeheads (Channidae) and the dragon snakeheads (Aenigmachannidae).

References 

Ray-finned fish suborders
Anabantiformes